Orla Laugesen (20 October 1912 – 18 October 1984) was a Danish footballer. He played in three matches for the Denmark national football team from 1935 to 1938.

References

External links
 

1912 births
1984 deaths
Danish men's footballers
Denmark international footballers
Place of birth missing
Association footballers not categorized by position